The 1906 Auckland City mayoral election was part of the New Zealand local elections held that same year. In 1906, elections were held for the Mayor of Auckland. The polling was conducted using the standard first-past-the-post electoral method.

Background
Incumbent mayor Arthur Myers was overwhelmingly re-elected against challenger Albert Bradley. The contest was marked by little interest with the result being regarded as a foregone conclusion. Consequently there was a low turnout.

Mayoralty results

References

Mayoral elections in Auckland
1906 elections in New Zealand
Politics of the Auckland Region
1900s in Auckland